CFR Title 44 – Emergency Management and Assistance is one of 50 titles in the United States Code of Federal Regulations (CFR). Title 44 is the principal set of rules and regulations issued by federal agencies of the United States regarding emergency management and assistance.

Structure 

The table of contents, as reflected in the e-CFR updated February 19, 2014, is as follows:

References

 44